Elis ( – Eparchia Ileias) was one of the provinces of the Elis Prefecture. The seat of administration was Pyrgos. Its territory corresponded with that of the current municipalities Andravida-Kyllini, Ilida, Olympia, Pineios and Pyrgos (except the municipal unit Volakas). It was abolished in 2006.

Subdivisions
The Elis province was subdivided into the following municipalities (situation after the 1997 Kapodistrias reform):
Amaliada 
Andravida
Archaia Olympia
Foloi
Gastouni
Iardanos 
Kastro-Kyllini 
Lampeia
Lasiona 
Lechaina 
Oleni 
Pineia 
Pyrgos
Tragano
Vartholomio
Vouprasia

References

Elis
Provinces of Greece